Liu Hsia (28 February 1942 – 8 February 2003), better known by her pen name Hsinglintzu, was a Taiwanese writer. 

She was born in Fufeng, Shaanxi on 28 February 1942, and later moved to Taiwan, attending elementary school in Beitou. Liu was diagnosed with atrophic arthritis, a form of rheumatoid arthritis, in 1954, aged 12. Her condition ended her formal education and required the use of a wheelchair. Aged 16, Liu converted to Christianity. In the early 1970s, Liu spent two years as a volunteer with two organizations, both working with the disabled. In 1982, Liu founded the Eden Social Welfare Foundation with NT$200,000 she had won as one of ten "outstanding young women" of 1980. The organization was named after the Garden of Eden, as Liu's goal was to create a paradise for the disabled. Though she worked with six fellow Christians as cofounders, Liu was regarded as the "spiritual leader" of the organization.

Liu launched a symbolic campaign for the Legislative Yuan in 1989, though electoral law required candidates to have completed a high school education. Liu became a national policy adviser to President Chen Shui-bian in May 2001.

Liu died of atrial flutter on 8 February 2003, at Tri-Service General Hospital. She had been dragged from her bed at home by her Indonesian caregiver, Vinarsih, resulting in broken bones and bruises. Vinarsih claimed to have dreamed of Liu's late father, who told Vinarsih to help Liu because there was an earthquake. Vinarsih was later diagnosed with a mental disorder. The incident led a group of social welfare organizations to petition for labor protections on behalf of foreign caregivers.

Pen name
"People of the apricot forest" is a traditional Chinese epithet for physicians; especially for skilled ones. The epithet derives from the life of Eastern Han physician Dong Feng.

References

1942 births
2003 deaths
Republic of China essayists
Taiwanese Protestants
Taiwanese disability rights activists
Writers from Xi'an
Taiwanese women essayists
20th-century Taiwanese women writers
21st-century Taiwanese women writers
20th-century essayists
21st-century essayists
Taiwanese people from Shaanxi
Senior Advisors to President Chen Shui-bian
Writers from Taipei
20th-century pseudonymous writers
Pseudonymous women writers